Bella Myat Thiri Lwin, also known as Bella, (born Myat Thiri Lwin (မြတ်သီရိလွင်) on 22 January 1999) is a Burmese actress, model and beauty pageant title holder. She was crowned the Miss World Myanmar 2016 and represented Myanmar at the Miss World 2016.

Early life and education
Bella was born on 22 January 1999 in Yangon, Myanmar.  She has one older sibling Marco Victor, a model and winner of Mister Globel 2014. She attended high school at Basic Education High School No. 2 Mayangone. She graduated from Dagon University with a degree in Psychology.

Pageantry and modeling
She joined Tin Moe Lwin's model training in 2015. Since then, she took professional training in modelling and catwalk. She then entered the entertainment industry and participated in many runway fashion shows. She competed in the local contest Miss Forever Gems 2015, and got first runner-up award.

Miss World Myanmar 2016
After the competition in Miss Forever Gems 2015, she then competed in Miss World Myanmar 2016 and became the Miss World Myanmar 2016 and also won the titles for Miss Personality and Miss Popular awards. It was held on June 4, 2016 at Gandamar Grand Ballroom in Yangon.

Miss World 2016
She represented Myanmar at the Miss World 2016 pageant which was held on 18 December 2016 at the MGM National Harbor, Washington, D.C., United States. But, she was unplaced.

Career
Bella began her acting career, after the competing in Miss World 2016. She has appeared in music videos and gained popularity after acting in Ni Ni Khin Zaw's MTV "Chit Hlyat Lan Khwel". She also acted in Phyo Hylan Hein's MTV "Wutt" alongside Myint Myat. Her hardwork as a model and acting in music videos was noticed by the film industry and soon, movie casting offers came rolling in.

She made her acting debut with a leading role in drama Love From The Future: Rhythm of Love, alongside Thiha Tun, aired on Channel 7 in 2017. She then starred in horror film Camera, alongside Htet Aung Shine and San Toe Naing, directed by Thar Nyi, released in 2018.

She made her big-screen debut with Jin Party where she played the main role with actors Yan Aung , Lu Min, Min Maw Kun , Yair Yint Aung, Htoo Aung, Kin Hlaing, Ko Pok, Joker, K Nyi and actresses Eaindra Kyaw Zin, Yin Latt, Shwe Eain Si which screened in Myanmar cinemas on 22 August 2019.

Brand ambassadorships
After winning the Miss World Myanmar 2016, she was appointed as a brand ambassador for AirAsia. In 2017, she was appointed as a brand ambassador for Best-T toothpaste, together with Sai Sai Kham Leng and Han Lay.

Filmography

Film
Camera (2018)

Film (Cinema)

Television series

References

External links

Living people
1999 births
21st-century Burmese actresses
Burmese beauty pageant winners
Burmese female models
Miss World 2016 delegates
Burmese film actresses